Ritu Rani (born 25 May 1997) is an Indian international footballer who plays as a defender for Gokulam Kerala and the India women's national team.

Club career
Ritu has played for FC Alakhpura and currently plays for Gokulam Kerala in India.

International career
Ritu was called up for the national team for the friendly matches in Malaysia in 2017. She capped for India at senior level during the 2019 Cotif Women's Tournament.

Honours
India
 South Asian Games Gold medal: 2019

Gokulam Kerala
Indian Women's League: 2021–22
AFC Women's Club Championship: third place 2021

References

External links 
 Ritu Rani at All India Football Federation
 

1997 births
Living people
People from Bhiwani district
Sportswomen from Haryana
Footballers from Haryana
Indian women's footballers
Women's association football fullbacks
India women's international footballers
Gokulam Kerala FC Women players
Indian Women's League players
South Asian Games gold medalists for India
South Asian Games medalists in football